Hulu Selangor is a federal constituency in Hulu Selangor District, Selangor, Malaysia, that has been represented in the Dewan Rakyat since 1955.

The federal constituency is mandated to return a single member to the Dewan Rakyat under the first past the post voting system.

Demographics

History

Polling districts
According to the federal gazette issued on 31 October 2022, the Hulu Selangor constituency is divided into 50 polling districts.

Representation history

State constituency

Current state assembly members

Local governments

Election results

References

Selangor federal constituencies
Constituencies established in 1955